Takahagi Scoutfield ("Yamato no Mori" Takahagi Scoutfield) is an educational camp facility owned and managed by the Scout Association of Japan, located in Takahagi, Ibaraki, near the Pacific coast. Takahagi Scoutfield replaced Yamanaka Scout Camp at the end of August 2017 for training Scout leaders.

In 2012, the Scout Association of Japan received a donation of vast forests of approximately 2.7 square kilometers in Takahagi, Ibaraki Prefecture, from Daiwa House. Permanent facilities include an Administrative Building with accommodations for 44 people, dining room/kitchen, meeting room, training room; an outdoor auditorium of  that seats about 100 people; a tent campsite with accommodations for about 800 people and about 50 campfire places available; a communal plaza (Hiroba 広場), and an outdoor arena stage.

Yamanaka Scout Camp was superseded in August 2017 by Takahagi Scoutfield, after the closure of Yamanaka Scout Camp. It is open to local schools, youth groups, and educational organizations within Ibaraki Prefecture.

References

Scouting in Japan
2012 establishments in Japan